{{Automatic taxobox
| taxon = Saccharoturris
| image = Saccharoturris consentanea 001.jpg
| image_caption = Shell of † Saccharoturris consentanea
| authority = Woodring, 1928 
| synonyms_ref = 
| synonyms =
| type_species= 
| subdivision_ranks = Species
| subdivision = See text
| display_parents = 3
}}Saccharoturris is a genus of sea snails, marine gastropod mollusks in the family Mangeliidae
 
Species
Species within the genus Saccharoturris include:
 † Saccharoturris centrodes  J. Gardner, 1937  
 † Saccharoturris consentanea  (R.J.L. Guppy, 1896)
 Saccharoturris monocingulata'' (Dall, 1889)

References

 Woodring, W.P. (1928) Miocene mollusks from Bowden, Jamaica. Part II. Gastropods and discussion of results. Contributions to the geology and paleontology of the West Indies. Carnegie Institution of Washington Publication, 385, vii + 1–564, 40 pls.

External links
  Bouchet P., Kantor Yu.I., Sysoev A. & Puillandre N. (2011) A new operational classification of the Conoidea. Journal of Molluscan Studies 77: 273-308.
 
 Worldwide Mollusc Species Data Base: Mangeliidae